Bryn Mawr Presbyterian Church is a church in Bryn Mawr, Pennsylvania; founded in 1873, it is currently a 2,500 member church of the PC(USA). It is located on the Main Line, just west of Philadelphia. Being a large congregation, the church is active seven days a week.

Worship in Bryn Mawr Presbyterian Church is traditional: the architecture includes stained glass windows, and the music is provided by a pipe organ and choir, which is directed by Jeffrey Brillhart. Besides worship on Sunday mornings, the congregation takes part in a variety of opportunities for faith enrichment, education, fellowship, and outreach on behalf of others. The church's theology is inclusive and emphasizes diversity, receiving people regardless of race, ethnic origin, sexual orientation, or socioeconomic status.

Notable members
 U.S. President Woodrow Wilson was a member of this church while he served on the faculty at nearby Bryn Mawr College.
 The church sponsored the 40-year-long medical mission to India by William James Wanless.

References

External links
Church website

Presbyterian churches in Pennsylvania
Churches in Montgomery County, Pennsylvania